When You Hear the Bells is a 1969 Croatian war film directed by Antun Vrdoljak. It was entered into the 6th Moscow International Film Festival where it won a Silver Prize.

In 1999, a poll of Croatian film critics found it to be one of the best Croatian films ever made.

Cast
 Boris Buzančić as Vjeko
 Pavle Vuisić as Gara
 Boris Dvornik as Kubura
 Fabijan Šovagović as Mićan
 Ivica Vidović as Meho
 Branka Vrdoljak as Marija
 Vanja Drach as Maks
 Antun Nalis as Charles / Topnik
 Izet Hajdarhodžić as Nikola
 Branko Špoljar as Komandant bataljona
 Mirko Boman as Partizan

References

External links
 

1969 films
1960s Croatian-language films
Films directed by Antun Vrdoljak
Croatian war films
Yugoslav war films
Films based on non-fiction books
Films based on works by Croatian writers
1969 directorial debut films
Films set in Yugoslavia
War films set in Partisan Yugoslavia
1969 war films
Yugoslav World War II films
Croatian World War II films